The Labyrinth is an extensive flat upland area which has been deeply eroded, at the west end of Wright Valley, in Victoria Land, Antarctica. It was so named by the Victoria University of Wellington Antarctic Expedition (1958–59) because the eroded dolerite of which it is formed gives an appearance of a labyrinth.

See also
Jackson Pond

References

Plateaus of Antarctica
Landforms of Victoria Land
McMurdo Dry Valleys